Romaizah Mohd Salleh is the current Minister of Education (MoE) since 2022, the Chairperson of Universiti Teknologi Brunei (UTB) Council members, Universiti Brunei Darussalam (UBD), and Sultan Sharif Ali Islamic University (UNISSA). She previously holds the position of Deputy minister and Acting Minister of the same Ministry in 2018.

Political career

Salleh was Brunei's Permanent Secretary for the Ministry of Education in 2017.

On 30 January 2018, Salleh was appointed as a deputy minister in the Ministry of Education.

It was announced on 7 June 2022, Salleh would replace Hamzah Sulaiman as the Minister of Education, making her the first woman to hold that position in the Bruneian government.

Honours 

  Order of Seri Paduka Mahkota Brunei First Class (SPMB) – Datin Seri Paduka
  Order of Setia Negara Brunei First Class (PSNB) – Datin Seri Setia (15 July 2022)

References

Government ministers of Brunei
Year of birth missing (living people)
Living people